Stephen Higgins (born 1938) is the American director of the Bureau of Alcohol, Tobacco and Firearms, 1983–1993.

Stephen Higgins may also refer to:

 Stephen Higgins (conductor), British conductor, accompanist, arranger, and presenter
 Stephen Higgins, runner up of The Apprentice Irish TV series in 2009
 Steve Higgins (born 1963), American writer, producer, announcer, actor, and comedian